Dora Ntloko Tamana (11 November 1901 – 23 July 1983) was a South African anti-apartheid activist.

Early life
Dora Ntloko was born at Nqamakwe, in Hlobo, Transkei, near Dutywa, then part of Cape Colony. Her grandfather was a Methodist preacher, but as a teen Dora converted, with her family, to the Israelite denomination. She was 20 when her father died in the 1921 Bulhoek Massacre of Israelite sect members.

Career
After her father's death, Dora Ntloko moved to Queenstown, and after marriage and motherhood to Cape Town. During World War II, she lived in the Blouvlei settlement, where she became politically active with the Cape Flats Distress Association, resisting efforts to relocate the squatting residents. She joined the Communist Party in South Africa during this time, and soon the African National Congress Women's League. 

Dora Tamana's particular interest was in self-help programs: a food committee, a women's sewing cooperative, a childcare program. In her Blouvlei/Blaauwvlei settlement in Cape Town, she became involved with the Athlone Committee for Nursery Education. The women of this committee were involved in establishing several schools in disadvantaged areas and they also founded the Maynardville Open-Air Theatre on 1 December 1950 (as a fund raiser for charitable projects). Dora Tamana was joined by two other ladies from that committee, fellow Communist Party member Jean Bernadt and Athlone committee chair Margaret Molteno, to build a school and health centre in Blouvlei. The three women worked to realise Dora Tamana's vision and they founded the Blouvlei Nursery School and family health centre in May 1955.

She took a leadership role in the anti-pass movement in 1953, and in 1954 became National Secretary of the Federation of South African Women (FEDSAW).  But in 1955, after attending the World Congress of Mothers in Switzerland with Lillian Ngoyi, she was banned by the South African government from attending political meetings.

Harassed by police and rezoned out of Blouvlei, she moved to Gugulethu. In her sixties, she served two jail sentences for her activism, and her son Bothwell was imprisoned and sentenced to death (he was later released, after Zimbabwe's independence). But she stayed active with women's protests into the 1970s, and spoke at the launching meeting of the United Women's Organization in 1981. Her poem exhorted the next generations of South African women to unite and act together for change:
You who have no words, speak.
You who have no homes, speak.
You who have no schools, speak.
You who have to run like chickens from the vulture, speak.
Let us share our problems so that we can solve them together.
We must free ourselves.

Personal life
Dora Ntloko married another Bulhoek survivor, John Tamana. She had eight children; three of her children died in infancy. John Tamana left the family in 1948. Dora Tamana died in 1983, aged 82 years. A park in Cape Town was named for Dora Tamana, dedicated in 2015 by government official Nomaindia Mfeketo.

References

External links
Jane Rosenthal, They Fought for Freedom: Dora Tamana (Maskew Miller Longman 1996). . A book for classroom use.

1901 births
1983 deaths
South African activists
South African women activists
South African women
Members of the Order of Luthuli